Kenichiro Kogure (born 11 November 1979) is a Japanese former futsal player and current Japan national futsal team manager.

Clubs 
 2001–2005:  FIRE FOX
 2005–2008:  :es:Clipeus Fútbol Sala Nazareno
 2008–2009:  Carnicer Torrejón FS
 2008: → MM Pérez Bujalance (loan)
 2009–2012:  Nagoya Oceans

Titles 
 F.League (3)
 2009–10, 2010–11, 2011–12
 F.League Ocean Cup (2)
 2010, 2011
 AFC Futsal Club Championship (1)
 2011

References

External links
FIFA profile

1979 births
Living people
Japanese men's futsal players
Japanese futsal coaches
Nagoya Oceans players
People from Kanagawa Prefecture